Dafni (meaning "laurel", before 1957: Δάμιζα - Damiza) is a village and a community in the municipal unit of Amaliada, Elis, Greece. It is situated in a hilly, rural area, 3 km west of Keramidia, 4 km northeast of Chavari, 10 km northeast of Amaliada and 13 km west of Simopoulo. There is an archaeological site near Dafni.  The community Dafni consists of the villages Dafni and Kalathas.

Historical population

External links
Amaliada City Web Portal - NEW- www.amaliada.net
GTP - Dafni

See also

List of settlements in Elis

References

Populated places in Elis